Coleophora crypsiphanes is a moth of the family Coleophoridae that is endemic to Sri Lanka.

The head and thorax are glossy whitish-grey or grey-whitish. The palpi and antennae are simple and grey-whitish. The abdomen is whitish-grey and the forewings are greyish-ochreous with a strong silvery reflection irrorated with dark grey, especially towards the costa and posteriorly. The hindwings are light grey.

References

External links

crypsiphanes
Moths of Asia
Endemic fauna of Sri Lanka
Moths described in 1917